The 1987 San Francisco Giants season was the Giants' 105th season in Major League Baseball, their 30th season in San Francisco since their move from New York following the 1957 season, and their 28th at Candlestick Park. The Giants finished in first place in the National League West with a record of 90 wins and 72 losses. They lost the National League Championship Series in seven games to the St. Louis Cardinals. It was their first playoff appearance since 1971.

Offseason
 October 16, 1986: Brad Gulden was released by the San Francisco Giants.
 October 16, 1986: Chuck Hensley was released by the San Francisco Giants.
 October 21, 1986: Mike Jeffcoat was released by the San Francisco Giants.
 February 4, 1987: Atlee Hammaker was signed as a free agent by the Giants.
 March 31, 1987: Dan Gladden and David Blakely (minors) were traded by the Giants to the Minnesota Twins for Jose Dominguez (minors), Ray Velasquez (minors) and a player to be named later. The Twins completed the deal by sending Bryan Hickerson to the Giants on June 15.

Regular season
Mike LaCoss pitched a 10-inning complete game shutout against the Los Angeles Dodgers on August 16; as of 2021, he remains the last Giants pitcher to throw more than nine innings in a game. On September 9, Nolan Ryan struck out Mike Aldrete for the 4,500th strikeout of his career.

Opening Day starters
Bob Brenly
Chris Brown
Will Clark
Chili Davis
Mike Krukow
Jeffrey Leonard
Candy Maldonado
Robby Thompson
José Uribe

Season standings

Record vs. opponents

Notable transactions
 April 25, 1987: Colin Ward and Steve Miller (minors) were traded by the Giants to the San Diego Padres for Mark Wasinger and Tim Meagher (minors).
 May 28, 1987: Greg Minton was released by the Giants.
 June 2, 1987: Mike Benjamin was drafted by the Giants in the 3rd round of the 1987 Major League Baseball draft. Player signed June 14, 1987.
 July 5, 1987: Mark Davis, Chris Brown, Keith Comstock, and Mark Grant were traded by the Giants to the San Diego Padres for Dave Dravecky, Craig Lefferts, and Kevin Mitchell.
 July 31, 1987: Mackey Sasser and $50,000 were traded by the Giants to the Pittsburgh Pirates for Don Robinson.
 August 21, 1987: Jeff Robinson and Scott Medvin were traded by the Giants to the Pittsburgh Pirates for Rick Reuschel.
 September 1, 1987: Dave Henderson was acquired by the Giants from the Boston Red Sox for a player to be named later.

Major League debuts
Batters: 
Kirt Manwaring (Sep 15) 
 Jessie Reid (Sep 9)  
Mackey Sasser (Jul 17)  
Matt Williams (Apr 11)  
Pitchers: 
John Burkett (Sep 15)

Game log and schedule

|-  style="text-align:center; background:#bfb;"
| 1 || April 6 || Padres || 4–3 (12) || || || || Candlestick Park || || 1–0 || W1
|-  style="text-align:center; background:#bfb;"
| 2 || April 7 || Padres || 4–3 || || || || Candlestick Park || || 2–0 || W2
|-  style="text-align:center; background:#bfb;"
| 3 || April 8 || Padres || 2–1 || || || || Candlestick Park || || 3–0 || W3
|-  style="text-align:center; background:#bfb;"
| 4 || April 9 || @ Dodgers || 8–1 || || || || Dodger Stadium || || 4–0 || W4
|-  style="text-align:center; background:#bfb;"
| 5 || April 10 || @ Dodgers || 5–4 (11) || || || || Dodger Stadium || || 5–0 || W5
|-  style="text-align:center; background:#fbb;"
| 6 || April 11 || @ Dodgers || 1–5 || || || || Dodger Stadium || || 5–1 || L1
|-  style="text-align:center; background:#fbb;"
| 7 || April 12 || @ Dodgers || 5–7 || || || || Dodger Stadium || || 5–2 || L2
|-  style="text-align:center; background:#bfb;"
| 8 || April 13 || @ Padres || 13–6 || || || || Jack Murphy Stadium || || 6–2 || W1
|-  style="text-align:center; background:#bfb;"
| 9 || April 14 || @ Padres || 3–2 || || || || Jack Murphy Stadium || || 7–2 || W2
|-  style="text-align:center; background:#bfb;"
| 10 || April 15 || @ Padres || 1–0 || || || || Jack Murphy Stadium || || 8–2 || W3
|-  style="text-align:center; background:#fbb;"
| 11 || April 17 || Braves || 0–2 || || || || Candlestick Park || || 8–3 || L1
|-  style="text-align:center; background:#bfb;"
| 12 || April 18 || Braves || 2–1 (10) || || || || Candlestick Park || || 9–3 || W1
|-  style="text-align:center; background:#bfb;"
| 13 || April 19 || Braves || 4–3 || || || || Candlestick Park || || 10–3 || W2
|-  style="text-align:center; background:#bfb;"
| 14 || April 20 || Dodgers || 4–3 || || || || Candlestick Park || || 11–3 || W3
|-  style="text-align:center; background:#fbb;"
| 15 || April 21 || Dodgers || 8–11 (10) || || || || Candlestick Park || || 11–4 || L1
|-  style="text-align:center; background:#fbb;"
| 16 || April 22 || Dodgers || 3–5 || || || || Candlestick Park || || 11–5 || L2
|-  style="text-align:center; background:#bfb;"
| 17 || April 24 || @ Braves || 7–5 || || || || Atlanta–Fulton County Stadium || || 12–5 || W1
|-  style="text-align:center; background:#fbb;"
| 18 || April 25 || @ Braves || 3–5 || || || || Atlanta–Fulton County Stadium || || 12–6 || L1
|-  style="text-align:center; background:#bfb;"
| 19 || April 26 || @ Braves || 6–4 || || || || Atlanta–Fulton County Stadium || || 13–6 || W1
|-  style="text-align:center; background:#bfb;"
| 20 || April 27 || @ Braves || 7–3 || || || || Atlanta–Fulton County Stadium || || 14–6 || W2
|-  style="text-align:center; background:#bfb;"
| 21 || April 28 || @ Cubs || 6–2 || || || || Wrigley Field || || 15–6 || W3
|-  style="text-align:center; background:#fbb;"
| 22 || April 29 || @ Cubs || 4–8 || || || || Wrigley Field || || 15–7 || L1
|-  style="text-align:center; background:#bfb;"
| 23 || April 30 || @ Cubs || 5–4 || || || || Wrigley Field || || 16–7 || W1
|-

|-  style="text-align:center; background:#fbb;"
| 24 || May 1 || @ Pirates || 2–4 || || || || Three Rivers Stadium || || 16–8 || L1
|-  style="text-align:center; background:#fbb;"
| 25 || May 2 || @ Pirates || 0–1 || || || || Three Rivers Stadium || || 16–9 || L2
|-  style="text-align:center; background:#bfb;"
| 26 || May 4 || @ Cardinals || 10–7 || || || || Busch Stadium || || 17–9 || W1
|-  style="text-align:center; background:#bfb;"
| 27 || May 5 || @ Cardinals || 10–6 || || || || Busch Stadium || || 18–9 || W2
|-  style="text-align:center; background:#fbb;"
| 28 || May 6 || Cubs || 4–9 || || || || Candlestick Park || || 18–10 || L1
|-  style="text-align:center; background:#bfb;"
| 29 || May 7 || Cubs || 11–1 || || || || Candlestick Park || || 19–10 || W1
|-  style="text-align:center; background:#bfb;"
| 30 || May 8 || Pirates || 4–2 || || || || Candlestick Park || || 20–10 || W2
|-  style="text-align:center; background:#bfb;"
| 31 || May 9 || Pirates || 9–4 || || || || Candlestick Park || || 21–10 || W3
|-  style="text-align:center; background:#fbb;"
| 32 || May 10 || Pirates || 1–4 (11) || || || || Candlestick Park || || 21–11 || L1
|-  style="text-align:center; background:#fbb;"
| 33 || May 12 || Cardinals || 5–6 || || || || Candlestick Park || || 21–12 || L2
|-  style="text-align:center; background:#fbb;"
| 34 || May 13 || Cardinals || 6–7 || || || || Candlestick Park || || 21–13 || L3
|-  style="text-align:center; background:#fbb;"
| 35 || May 15 || @ Mets || 3–8 || || || || Shea Stadium || || 21–14 || L4
|-  style="text-align:center; background:#bfb;"
| 36 || May 16 || @ Mets || 5–4 (10) || || || || Shea Stadium || || 22–14 || W1
|-  style="text-align:center; background:#fbb;"
| 37 || May 17 || @ Mets || 4–6 || || || || Shea Stadium || || 22–15 || L1
|-  style="text-align:center; background:#fbb;"
| 38 || May 18 || @ Expos || 2–7 || || || || Olympic Stadium || || 22–16 || L2
|-  style="text-align:center; background:#bfb;"
| 39 || May 19 || @ Expos || 6–2 || || || || Olympic Stadium || || 23–16 || W1
|-  style="text-align:center; background:#bfb;"
| 40 || May 20 || @ Expos || 9–7 || || || || Olympic Stadium || || 24–16 || W2
|-  style="text-align:center; background:#bfb;"
| 41 || May 22 || @ Phillies || 2–1 || || || || Veterans Stadium || || 25–16 || W3
|-  style="text-align:center; background:#fbb;"
| 42 || May 23 || @ Phillies || 8–9 || || || || Veterans Stadium || || 25–17 || L1
|-  style="text-align:center; background:#bfb;"
| 43 || May 24 || @ Phillies || 6–3 || || || || Veterans Stadium || || 26–17 || W1
|-  style="text-align:center; background:#fbb;"
| 44 || May 25 || Mets || 7–8 || || || || Candlestick Park || || 26–18 || L1
|-  style="text-align:center; background:#fbb;"
| 45 || May 26 || Mets || 2–3 || || || || Candlestick Park || || 26–19 || L2
|-  style="text-align:center; background:#fbb;"
| 46 || May 27 || Mets || 3–4 || || || || Candlestick Park || || 26–20 || L3
|-  style="text-align:center; background:#fbb;"
| 47 || May 29 || Expos || 4–10 || || || || Candlestick Park || || 26–21 || L4
|-  style="text-align:center; background:#fbb;"
| 48 || May 30 || Expos || 4–6 || || || || Candlestick Park || || 26–22 || L5
|-  style="text-align:center; background:#bfb;"
| 49 || May 31 || Expos || 8–0 || || || || Candlestick Park || || 27–22 || W1
|-

|-  style="text-align:center; background:#bfb;"
| 50 || June 1 || Phillies || 9–2 || || || || Candlestick Park || || 28–22 || W2
|-  style="text-align:center; background:#fbb;"
| 51 || June 2 || Phillies || 6–7 || || || || Candlestick Park || || 28–23 || L1
|-  style="text-align:center; background:#bfb;"
| 52 || June 3 || Phillies || 4–1 || || || || Candlestick Park || || 29–23 || W1
|-  style="text-align:center; background:#fbb;"
| 53 || June 5 || @ Astros || 1–6 || || || || Astrodome || || 29–24 || L1
|-  style="text-align:center; background:#bfb;"
| 54 || June 6 || @ Astros || 4–3 (12) || || || || Astrodome || || 30–24 || W1
|-  style="text-align:center; background:#fbb;"
| 55 || June 7 || @ Astros || 0–3 || || || || Astrodome || || 30–25 || L1
|-  style="text-align:center; background:#fbb;"
| 56 || June 8 || @ Reds || 6–7 || || || || Riverfront Stadium || || 30–26 || L2
|-  style="text-align:center; background:#bfb;"
| 57 || June 9 || @ Reds || 10–2 || || || || Riverfront Stadium || || 31–26 || W1
|-  style="text-align:center; background:#bfb;"
| 58 || June 10 || @ Reds || 9–4 || || || || Riverfront Stadium || || 32–26 || W2
|-  style="text-align:center; background:#bfb;"
| 59 || June 11 || Padres || 1–0 || || || || Candlestick Park || || 33–26 || W3
|-  style="text-align:center; background:#fbb;"
| 60 || June 12 || Padres || 0–5 || || || || Candlestick Park || || 33–27 || L1
|-  style="text-align:center; background:#fbb;"
| 61 || June 13 || Padres || 2–11 || || || || Candlestick Park || || 33–28 || L2
|-  style="text-align:center; background:#fbb;"
| 62 || June 14 || Padres || 1–4 || || || || Candlestick Park || || 33–29 || L3
|-  style="text-align:center; background:#fbb;"
| 63 || June 16 || @ Braves || 2–7 || || || || Atlanta–Fulton County Stadium || || 33–30 || L4
|-  style="text-align:center; background:#fbb;"
| 64 || June 17 || @ Braves || 1–6 || || || || Atlanta–Fulton County Stadium || || 33–31 || L5
|-  style="text-align:center; background:#fbb;"
| 65 || June 18 || @ Padres || 1–3 || || || || Jack Murphy Stadium || || 33–32 || L6
|-  style="text-align:center; background:#bfb;"
| 66 || June 19 || @ Padres || 7–6 || || || || Jack Murphy Stadium || || 34–32 || W1
|-  style="text-align:center; background:#fbb;"
| 67 || June 20 || @ Padres || 4–10 || || || || Jack Murphy Stadium || || 34–33 || L1
|-  style="text-align:center; background:#bfb;"
| 68 || June 21 || @ Padres || 11–2 || || || || Jack Murphy Stadium || || 35–33 || W1
|-  style="text-align:center; background:#fbb;"
| 69 || June 23 || Reds || 1–4 || || || || Candlestick Park || || 35–34 || L1
|-  style="text-align:center; background:#fbb;"
| 70 || June 24 || Reds || 4–5 (10) || || || || Candlestick Park || || 35–35 || L2
|-  style="text-align:center; background:#bfb;"
| 71 || June 25 || Reds || 7–6 || || || || Candlestick Park || || 36–35 || W1
|-  style="text-align:center; background:#fbb;"
| 72 || June 26 || Astros || 6–9 || || || || Candlestick Park || || 36–36 || L1
|-  style="text-align:center; background:#fbb;"
| 73 || June 27 || Astros || 5–6 || || || || Candlestick Park || || 36–37 || L2
|-  style="text-align:center; background:#bfb;"
| 74 || June 28 || Astros || 8–4 || || || || Candlestick Park || || 37–37 || W1
|-  style="text-align:center; background:#fbb;"
| 75 || June 29 || Braves || 0–1 || || || || Candlestick Park || || 37–38 || L1
|-  style="text-align:center; background:#bfb;"
| 76 || June 30 || Braves || 5–2 || || || || Candlestick Park || || 38–38 || W1
|-

|-  style="text-align:center; background:#fbb;"
| 77 || July 1 || Braves || 3–8 || || || || Candlestick Park || || 38–39 || W2
|-  style="text-align:center; background:#bfb;"
| 78 || July 3 || @ Cubs || 3–1 || || || || Wrigley Field || || 39–39 || W3
|-  style="text-align:center; background:#fbb;"
| 79 || July 4 || @ Cubs || 3–5 || || || || Wrigley Field || || 39–40 || L1
|-  style="text-align:center; background:#bfb;"
| 80 || July 5 || @ Cubs || 7–5 || || || || Wrigley Field || || 40–40 || W1
|-  style="text-align:center; background:#bfb;"
| 81 || July 6 || @ Pirates || 7–5 || || || || Three Rivers Stadium || || 41–40 || W2
|-  style="text-align:center; background:#bfb;"
| 82 || July 6 || @ Pirates || 7–4 || || || || Three Rivers Stadium || || 42–40 || W3
|-  style="text-align:center; background:#fbb;"
| 83 || July 7 || @ Pirates || 4–6 (12) || || || || Three Rivers Stadium || || 42–41 || L1
|-  style="text-align:center; background:#bfb;"
| 84 || July 8 || @ Pirates || 8–4 (14) || || || || Three Rivers Stadium || || 43–41 || W1
|-  style="text-align:center; background:#fbb;"
| 85 || July 9 || @ Cardinals || 6–7 (10) || || || || Busch Stadium || || 43–42 || L1
|-  style="text-align:center; background:#fbb;"
| 86 || July 10 || @ Cardinals || 5–7 (13) || || || || Busch Stadium || || 43–43 || L2
|-  style="text-align:center; background:#bfb;"
| 87 || July 11 || @ Cardinals || 3–1 || || || || Busch Stadium || || 44–43 || W1
|-  style="text-align:center; background:#fbb;"
| 88 || July 12 || @ Cardinals || 2–3 || || || || Busch Stadium || || 44–44 || L1
|-  style="text-align:center; background:#fbb;"
| 89 || July 16 || Cubs || 1–4 || || || || Candlestick Park || || 44–45 || L1
|-  style="text-align:center; background:#fbb;"
| 90 || July 17 || Cubs || 1–5 || || || || Candlestick Park || || 44–46 || L2
|-  style="text-align:center; background:#bfb;"
| 91 || July 18 || Cubs || 9–2 || || || || Candlestick Park || || 45–46 || W1
|-  style="text-align:center; background:#bfb;"
| 92 || July 19 || Cubs || 4–3 || || || || Candlestick Park || || 46–46 || W2
|-  style="text-align:center; background:#fbb;"
| 93 || July 20 || Pirates || 6–7 || || || || Candlestick Park || || 46–47 || L1
|-  style="text-align:center; background:#bfb;"
| 94 || July 21 || Pirates || 7–0 || || || || Candlestick Park || || 47–47 || W1
|-  style="text-align:center; background:#fbb;"
| 95 || July 22 || Pirates || 0–4 || || || || Candlestick Park || || 47–48 || L1
|-  style="text-align:center; background:#bfb;"
| 96 || July 24 || Cardinals || 4–3 || || || || Candlestick Park || || 48–48 || W1
|-  style="text-align:center; background:#bfb;"
| 97 || July 25 || Cardinals || 5–4 || || || || Candlestick Park || || 49–48 || W2
|-  style="text-align:center; background:#bfb;"
| 98 || July 26 || Cardinals || 6–3 (10) || || || || Candlestick Park || || 50–48 || W3
|-  style="text-align:center; background:#bfb;"
| 99 || July 26 || Cardinals || 5–2 || || || || Candlestick Park || || 51–48 || W4
|-  style="text-align:center; background:#fbb;"
| 100 || July 27 || @ Dodgers || 5–6 (12) || || || || Dodger Stadium || || 51–49 || L1
|-  style="text-align:center; background:#fbb;"
| 101 || July 28 || @ Dodgers || 2–4 || || || || Dodger Stadium || || 51–50 || L2
|-  style="text-align:center; background:#fbb;"
| 102 || July 29 || @ Dodgers || 16–2 || || || || Dodger Stadium || || 52–50 || W1
|-  style="text-align:center; background:#fbb;"
| 103 || July 31 || @ Reds || 2–9 || || || || Riverfront Stadium || || 52–51 || L1
|-

|-  style="text-align:center; background:#bfb;"
| 104 || August 1 || @ Reds || 7–3 || || || || Riverfront Stadium || || 53–51 || W1
|-  style="text-align:center; background:#fbb;"
| 105 || August 2 || @ Reds || 4–5 (11) || || || || Riverfront Stadium || || 53–52 || L1
|-  style="text-align:center; background:#fbb;"
| 106 || August 3 || @ Astros || 3–5 (13) || || || || Astrodome || || 53–53 || L2
|-  style="text-align:center; background:#fbb;"
| 107 || August 4 || @ Astros || 4–5 || || || || Astrodome || || 53–54 || L3
|-  style="text-align:center; background:#fbb;"
| 108 || August 5 || @ Astros || 5–6 (11) || || || || Astrodome || || 53–55 || L4
|-  style="text-align:center; background:#bfb;"
| 109 || August 7 || Reds || 3–1 || || || || Candlestick Park || || 54–55 || W1
|-  style="text-align:center; background:#bfb;"
| 110 || August 8 || Reds || 5–2 || || || || Candlestick Park || || 55–55 || W2
|-  style="text-align:center; background:#bfb;"
| 111 || August 9 || Reds || 3–2 || || || || Candlestick Park || || 56–55 || W3
|-  style="text-align:center; background:#bfb;"
| 112 || August 9 || Reds || 5–2 || || || || Candlestick Park || || 57–55 || W4
|-  style="text-align:center; background:#bfb;"
| 113 || August 10 || Astros || 6–5 || || || || Candlestick Park || || 58–55 || W5
|-  style="text-align:center; background:#fbb;"
| 114 || August 11 || Astros || 3–7 || || || || Candlestick Park || || 58–56 || L1
|-  style="text-align:center; background:#bfb;"
| 115 || August 12 || Astros || 8–1 || || || || Candlestick Park || || 59–56 || W1
|-  style="text-align:center; background:#bfb;"
| 116 || August 13 || Astros || 7–6 (11) || || || || Candlestick Park || || 60–56 || W2
|-  style="text-align:center; background:#fbb;"
| 117 || August 14 || Dodgers || 3–4 || || || || Candlestick Park || || 60–57 || L1
|-  style="text-align:center; background:#bfb;"
| 118 || August 15 || Dodgers || 5–0 || || || || Candlestick Park || || 61–57 || W1
|-  style="text-align:center; background:#bfb;"
| 119 || August 16 || Dodgers || 1–0 (10) || || || || Candlestick Park || || 62–57 || W2
|-  style="text-align:center; background:#fbb;"
| 120 || August 18 || @ Mets || 2–7 || || || || Shea Stadium || || 62–58 || L1
|-  style="text-align:center; background:#bfb;"
| 121 || August 19 || @ Mets || 10–6 (10) || || || || Shea Stadium || || 63–58 || W1
|-  style="text-align:center; background:#fbb;"
| 122 || August 20 || @ Mets || 4–7 || || || || Shea Stadium || || 63–59 || L1
|-  style="text-align:center; background:#bfb;"
| 123 || August 21 || @ Expos || 6–3 || || || || Olympic Stadium || || 64–59 || W1
|-  style="text-align:center; background:#fbb;"
| 124 || August 22 || @ Expos || 4–5 (10) || || || || Olympic Stadium || || 64–60 || L1
|-  style="text-align:center; background:#bfb;"
| 125 || August 23 || @ Expos || 5–3 || || || || Olympic Stadium || || 65–60 || W1
|-  style="text-align:center; background:#bfb;"
| 126 || August 24 || @ Phillies || 6–1 || || || || Veterans Stadium || || 66–60 || W2
|-  style="text-align:center; background:#bfb;"
| 127 || August 25 || @ Phillies || 3–2 || || || || Veterans Stadium || || 67–60 || W3
|-  style="text-align:center; background:#bfb;"
| 128 || August 26 || @ Phillies || 2–0 || || || || Veterans Stadium || || 68–60 || W4
|-  style="text-align:center; background:#fbb;"
| 129 || August 28 || Mets || 0–4 || || || || Candlestick Park || || 68–61 || L1
|-  style="text-align:center; background:#bfb;"
| 130 || August 29 || Mets || 9–1 || || || || Candlestick Park || || 69–61 || W1
|-  style="text-align:center; background:#fbb;"
| 131 || August 30 || Mets || 3–5 || || || || Candlestick Park || || 69–62 || L1
|-  style="text-align:center; background:#bfb;"
| 132 || August 31 || Expos || 5–0 || || || || Candlestick Park || || 70–62 || W1
|-

|-  style="text-align:center; background:#bfb;"
| 133 || September 1 || Expos || 14–4 || || || || Candlestick Park || || 71–62 || W2
|-  style="text-align:center; background:#fbb;"
| 134 || September 2 || Expos || 3–7 || || || || Candlestick Park || || 71–63 || L1
|-  style="text-align:center; background:#bfb;"
| 135 || September 4 || Phillies || 3–2 (10) || || || || Candlestick Park || || 72–63 || W1
|-  style="text-align:center; background:#bfb;"
| 136 || September 5 || Phillies || 6–3 || || || || Candlestick Park || || 73–63 || W2
|-  style="text-align:center; background:#bfb;"
| 137 || September 6 || Phillies || 4–1 || || || || Candlestick Park || || 74–63 || W3
|-  style="text-align:center; background:#fbb;"
| 138 || September 7 || @ Astros || 2–4 || || || || Astrodome || || 74–64 || L1
|-  style="text-align:center; background:#bfb;"
| 139 || September 8 || @ Astros || 6–4 || || || || Astrodome || || 75–64 || W1
|-  style="text-align:center; background:#fbb;"
| 140 || September 9 || @ Astros || 2–4 || || || || Astrodome || || 75–65 || L1
|-  style="text-align:center; background:#fbb;"
| 141 || September 11 || @ Reds || 3–4 || || || || Riverfront Stadium || || 75–66 || L2
|-  style="text-align:center; background:#bfb;"
| 142 || September 12 || @ Reds || 7–1 || || || || Riverfront Stadium || || 76–66 || W1
|-  style="text-align:center; background:#bfb;"
| 143 || September 13 || @ Reds || 6–1 || || || || Riverfront Stadium || || 77–66 || W2
|-  style="text-align:center; background:#bfb;"
| 144 || September 14 || Padres || 4–3 || || || || Candlestick Park || || 78–66 || W3
|-  style="text-align:center; background:#bfb;"
| 145 || September 15 || Padres || 13–3 || || || || Candlestick Park || || 79–66 || W4
|-  style="text-align:center; background:#bfb;"
| 146 || September 16 || Astros || 7–1 || || || || Candlestick Park || || 80–66 || W5
|-  style="text-align:center; background:#bfb;"
| 147 || September 17 || Astros || 4–0 || || || || Candlestick Park || || 81–66 || W6
|-  style="text-align:center; background:#bfb;"
| 148 || September 19 || Reds || 5–1 || || || || Candlestick Park || || 82–66 || W7
|-  style="text-align:center; background:#fbb;"
| 149 || September 20 || Reds || 6–10 || || || || Candlestick Park || || 82–67 || L1
|-  style="text-align:center; background:#fbb;"
| 150 || September 21 || Dodgers || 2–4 || || || || Candlestick Park || || 82–68 || L2
|-  style="text-align:center; background:#fbb;"
| 151 || September 22 || Dodgers || 3–4 || || || || Candlestick Park || || 82–69 || L3
|-  style="text-align:center; background:#bfb;"
| 152 || September 23 || Dodgers || 9–8 || || || || Candlestick Park || || 83–69 || W1
|-  style="text-align:center; background:#bfb;"
| 153 || September 25 || @ Braves || 9–2 || || || || Atlanta–Fulton County Stadium || || 84–69 || W2
|-  style="text-align:center; background:#fbb;"
| 154 || September 26 || @ Braves || 5–10 || || || || Atlanta–Fulton County Stadium || || 84–70 || L1
|-  style="text-align:center; background:#bfb;"
| 155 || September 27 || @ Braves || 15–6 || || || || Atlanta–Fulton County Stadium || || 85–70 || W1
|-  style="text-align:center; background:#bfb;"
| 156 || September 28 || @ Padres || 5–4 || || || || Jack Murphy Stadium || || 86–70 || W2
|-  style="text-align:center; background:#bfb;"
| 157 || September 29 || @ Padres || 5–3 || || || || Jack Murphy Stadium || || 87–70 || W3
|-  style="text-align:center; background:#bfb;"
| 158 || September 30 || @ Dodgers || 3–0 || || || || Dodger Stadium || || 88–70 || W4
|-

|-  style="text-align:center; background:#fbb;"
| 159 || October 1 || @ Dodgers || 0–7 || || || || Dodger Stadium || || 88–71 || L1
|-  style="text-align:center; background:#fbb;"
| 160 || October 2 || Braves || 4–6 || || || || Candlestick Park || || 88–72 || L2
|-  style="text-align:center; background:#bfb;"
| 161 || October 3 || Braves || 6–3 || || || || Candlestick Park || || 89–72 || W1
|-  style="text-align:center; background:#bfb;"
| 162 || October 4 || Braves || 5–4 (10) || || || || Candlestick Park || || 90–72 || W2
|-

Postseason

|-  style="text-align:center; background:#fbb;"
| 1 NLCS || October 6 || @ Cardinals || 3–5 || Mathews (1–0)|| Reuschel (0–1) || Dayley (1) || Busch Stadium || 55,331 || 0–1 || L1
|-  style="text-align:center; background:#bfb;"
| 2 NLCS || October 7 || @ Cardinals || 5–0 || Dravecky (1–0) || Tudor (0–1) || || Busch Stadium || 55,331 || 1–1 || W1
|-  style="text-align:center; background:#fbb;"
| 3 NLCS || October 9 || Cardinals || 5–6 || Forsch (1–0) || Robinson (0–1) || Worrell (1) || Candlestick Park || 57,913 || 1–2 || L1
|-  style="text-align:center; background:#bfb;"
| 4 NLCS || October 10 || Cardinals || 4–2 || Krukow (1–0) || Cox (0–1) || || Candlestick Park || 57,997 || 2–2 || W1
|-  style="text-align:center; background:#bfb;"
| 5 NLCS || October 11 || Cardinals || 6–3 || Price (1–0) || Forsch (1–1) || || Candlestick Park || 59,363 || 3–2 || W2
|-  style="text-align:center; background:#fbb;"
| 6 NLCS || October 13 || @ Cardinals || 0–1 || Tudor (1–1)|| Dravecky (1–1) || Dayley (2) || Busch Stadium || 55,331 || 3–3 || L1
|-  style="text-align:center; background:#fbb;"
| 7 NLCS || October 14 || @ Cardinals || 0–6 || Cox (1–1) || Hammaker (0–1) || || Busch Stadium || 55,331 || 3–4 || L2
|-

Roster

Player stats

Batting

Starters by position
Note: Pos = Position; G = Games played; AB = At bats; H = Hits; Avg. = Batting average; HR = Home runs; RBI = Runs batted in

Other batters
Note: G = Games played; AB = At bats; H = Hits; Avg. = Batting average; HR = Home runs; RBI = Runs batted in

Pitching

Starting pitchers
Note: G = Games pitched; IP = Innings pitched; W = Wins; L = Losses; ERA = Earned run average; SO = Strikeouts

Other pitchers
Note: G = Games pitched; IP = Innings pitched; W = Wins; L = Losses; ERA = Earned run average; SO = Strikeouts

Relief pitchers
Note: G = Games pitched; W = Wins; L = Losses; SV = Saves; ERA = Earned run average; SO = Strikeouts

National League Championship Series

Award winners
 Chris Speier, 2B, Willie Mac Award
All-Star Game

Farm system

LEAGUE CHAMPIONS: Fresno

References

External links
 1987 San Francisco Giants at Baseball Reference
 1987 San Francisco Giants at Baseball Almanac

San Francisco Giants seasons
San Francisco Giants season
National League West champion seasons
San Francisco Giants